William Penn Mott Jr. (October 19, 1909 – September 21, 1992), was a trained landscape architect who rose to direct the California Department of Parks and Recreation and U.S. National Park Service.  He earned bachelor and master degrees from Michigan State University and University of California, respectively. After graduation, he worked for the San Francisco office of the National Park Service (NPS) as a landscape architect from 1933 to 1940. He then became director of the Oakland, California Zoo. In 1962, he was hired as director of the East Bay Regional Park District until 1967. California Governor Ronald Reagan named Mott as the Director of the California Park Service in 1967, where he remained until 1985, when President Reagan named him to head the U.S. National Park Service (NPS). Mott served at the Federal level until President George H. W. Bush nominated a replacement for him in 1989. He continued to work for the NPS as a consultant until his death in 1992. His last major project was to transition the Presidio in San Francisco into a national park.

Education and early career
A native of New York City, Mott enrolled at Michigan State University, where he earned a bachelor's degree in landscape architecture in 1931. He continued his education at the University of California at Berkeley, receiving a master's degree in 1933. After graduation, he spent 14 years working as a landscape architect in San Francisco. He then became superintendent of parks for Oakland, California."

California Parks

City of Oakland
From 1946 to 1985 he served successively as Oakland's park superintendent, the East Bay Regional Park District's general manager, director of the California Department of Parks and Recreation under Governor Ronald Reagan.

East Bay Regional Park District (EBRPD)
Mott was hired as the general manager of EBRPD in 1962, replacing Richard Walpole, who had managed the agency from 1945 until he retired because of health issues in 1960. Wesley Adams had served as interim manager until Mott was hired.

The district comprised 20 parks and had an annual budget of about $12 million.

California Parks Director

National Park Service
Following his appointment as the 12th NPS director in May 1985, Mott issued a "Twelve Point Plan" to protect the parks and their resources, better serve the public, and improve the service's management. He took a strong interest in park interpretation and returned the NPS to a more expansionist posture after a near-moratorium on park additions during President Reagan's first term. When the Bush administration replaced him with its own appointee in April 1989, Mott remained on the rolls as special assistant to the western regional director overseeing planning for the Presidio of San Francisco. He died in 1992 at Orinda, California of pneumonia.

Twelve Point Plan
The Twelve Point Plan in 1985 was a means to "strengthen public trust, revitalize the organization and assure its continued success over time". The twelve points are:
Develop a Long-range Strategy to Protect our Natural, Cultural, and Recreational Resources.
Pursue a Creative, Expanded Land Protection Initiative
Stimulate and Increase our Interpretive and Visitor Service Activities for Great Public Impact
Share Effectively with the Public our Understanding of Critical Resource issues
Increase Public Understanding of the Role and Function of the National Park Service
Expand the Role and Involvement of Citizens and Citizen Groups at all Levels in the National Park Service
Seek a Better Balance Between Visitor Use and Resource Management
Enhance our Ability to Meet the Diverse Uses that the Public Expects in National Parks
Expand Career Opportunities for our Employees
Plan, Design, and Maintain Appropriate Park Facilities
Develop a Team Relationship Between Concessioners and the National Park Service
Foster and Encourage more Creativity, Efficiency, and Effectiveness in the Management and Administration of the National Park Service.

Later activities and death
According to the New York Times, Mott served as a consultant to the NPS. His last major project was to transition the Presidio of San Francisco into a national park.

Mott died of heart failure at his home in Orinda, California on September 22, 1992, at the age of 82. His wife had died during 1981.

See also
National Park Service
East Bay Regional Park District

References

Allen, Annalee. Oakland Parks and Recreation celebrates 100 years at Defremery Park. Oakland Tribune, July 18, 2009.

External links
Finding Aid to the William Penn Mott Jr. Papers, 1931-1992 at The Bancroft Library, University of California, Berkeley
William Penn Mott papers. 1985-1989 at Clemson University Libraries, Clemson, SC

Further reading
 
 McCreery, Laura. Living Landscape. Berkeley, California. Wilderness Press. 2010. 

Directors of the National Park Service
1909 births
1992 deaths
Architects from New York City
People from Orinda, California
Michigan State University alumni
University of California alumni